The Institute for Astronomy (IfA) is a research unit within the University of Hawaiʻi System, led by Doug Simons as Director. IfA main headquarters are located at 2680 Woodlawn Drive in Honolulu, Hawaii, adjacent to the University of Hawaiʻi at Mānoa campus. Additional facilities are located at Pukalani, Maui and Hilo on Hawaii island (the Big Island). IfA employs over 150 astronomers and support staff. IfA astronomers perform research into Solar System objects, stars, galaxies and cosmology.

The Institute for Astronomy was founded in 1967 to conduct research and to manage the observatory complexes at Haleakalā, Maui and the Mauna Kea Observatory on the summit of Mauna Kea. It has approximately 55 faculty and employs over 300 people.

See also
Asteroid Terrestrial-impact Last Alert System (ATLAS)
B612 Foundation

References

External links
The Institute for Astronomy

1967 establishments in Hawaii
University of Hawaiʻi
Astronomy institutes and departments
Research institutes in Hawaii
Research institutes established in 1967